Constituency NA-175 (Rajanpur-II) was a constituency for the National Assembly of Pakistan. It comprised Rajanpur Tehsil and Rojhan Tehsil. After the 2018 delimitations, this constituency's areas were bifurcated between the new constituencies of NA-194 and NA-195.

Election 2002 

General elections were held on 10 Oct 2002. Sardar Nasrullah Khan Dreshak an Independent candidate won by 69,030 votes.

Election 2008 

General elections were held on 18 Feb 2008. Mir Dost Muhammad Mazari of PPP won by 78,427 votes.

Election 2013 

General elections were held on 11 May 2013. Dr. Hafeez Ur Rehman Drishak of PML-N won by 110,573 votes and became the  member of National Assembly.

References

External links 
Election result's official website

NA-175
Abolished National Assembly Constituencies of Pakistan